Shubin is the mythological spirit of the mines. The legend of Shubin is distributed mainly in the mining towns of the Donbas region of Ukraine. In the north one can hear several legends about the spirit of the mines. The spirit is usually good, but can be wicked. There is no single point of view about the etymology of the word. Explanations include: (1) the nickname of a miner, whose soul, according to legend, walks in a fur coat at the bottom of the mine with a torch in his hand and burns the gas (firedamp); (2) the name of the cruel mining master Shubin, who slew workers underground; (3) the sound from methane (Shu-Shu), which often accumulates in the mines.

Shubin in Ukraine

Legends about good Shubin
According to one version, Shubin is the ghost of a dead miner. Another is that he was a mining master who worked in the late 19th century on one of the mines in the Donbas. He had a gift for predicting collapses and methane emissions. Therefore, before each shift, the master would go down in the mine and, if he felt something was wrong, he warned of the danger. Hence, the name coal miners called the spirit that comes to them to help in a dangerous hour. 

In the mining towns, many stories go, people have seen this spirit with their own eyes. Once, when a man was in the mine, the lights went down. 
He was in complete darkness, lost his orientation, and could not find the exit. He fell into despair but suddenly he saw lights far away. The spirit drew near, holding a flashing beacon. The man was afraid, but obediently followed until he was removed from the labyrinth of darkness. 
Some miners say that Shubin can be good or bad, depending on which person he meets.

Legends of evil Shubin
Not all legends about Shubin depict him as the embodiment of good forces. Anthracite miners of the area claim that this ghost is  vindictive and often plagues them with accidents in the mines.

There is a legend that once, long ago somewhere in Donbas, a man came in search of a better life. He visited the tavern to request help in finding a job. Drunken miners said they would give him a test. The newcomer would have to go down the mine, light a torch, and walk a few meters. If he was not afraid, he could become a miner. A man did not guess the true purpose of this test. In fact, the miners wanted to determine whether there was methane in the mine, which always gave them a lot of trouble. If the gas exploded, it would save the lives of other miners who were due  to work the next day. The drunken miners cynically thought it was better for a beginner to take the risk. At a certain concentration the gas (firedamp or methane) burned but did not explode. In such a case, a fur coat gave the miner some protection from skin burns. That's why the newcomer put a fur coat on. Then he did what he was ordered but, unfortunately, there was an explosion.

Since then, a man's spirit has haunted the mines, taking vengeance for the wrong that was done to him. Sometimes it is voracious and causes terrible accidents that take the lives of dozens of miners. To cast the evil spirit from the Lugansk mines, Metropolitan Ioanniky  specially descended into a shaft in the Sverdlovsk region and said prayers there.

Shubin in Russia
Shubin is known in Russia. There, in some areas you can even hear the phrase "ему пришел шубин". This means that a man got into a very dangerous and desperate situation. They say that in the Urals in the 19th century lived a cruel master named Shubin, who slew people working underground. For this he was killed. Since then he haunts underground drains and is usually displayed in the image of a stooped old man in a fur coat and with pitted felt boots. They say that those who see Shubin are unlikely to remain alive.

Popularity of Shubin in Donbas
The popularity of legends about Shubin has led to his name being used in the Donbas region in entertainment, bars and a popular brand of beer Good Shubin from Donetsk brewery Sarmat.

Similar spirits
 Ukrainian Bila Koroleva (White Queen). In the beliefs of some miners the Shubin spirit appears as a female. Once, a miner from Sverdlovsk region went missing. After a long search he was finally found in the mine naked. He went mad and was taken to a mental hospital. Then some other miners went mad. All of them told about the "white queen", a beautiful woman who tried to cheat them, but the miners could not bear her towering beauty and completely lost their reason. People have long mocked these stories and passed by the mental hospital where the miners were treated and said that it was the home of the white kings. Since the white queen have disappeared from the mine but no one can tell exactly when she would come again.
 Polish Skarbnik (Treasurer) which inhabits the Wieliczka salt mines
 Gothic Kobold - a spirit guardian of underground mines and jewelry

Literature
 O.Forostyuk. Religious Luganschina: a historical and legal aspects. - Lugansk: Svitlycja, 2004.

Sources
Скарбник – добрий дух соляної шахти „Величка” 
 Легенди підземель

Slavic tutelary deities
Ukrainian mythology
Mining folklore
Slavic legendary creatures